Lam Ieng is a Macau football club, which plays in the town of Macau. They play in the Macau's first division, the Campeonato da 1ª Divisão do Futebol.

Achievements 
Macau Championship:

Current squad 

Football clubs in Macau